Linda Mienzer (born 31 March 1965) is a Bermudian woman cricketer. She captained the Bermudian women's cricket team at the 2008 Women's Cricket World Cup Qualifier.

See also 
 List of LGBT sportspeople

References

External links 
 

1965 births
Living people
Bermudian women cricketers
Bermudian LGBT sportspeople
LGBT cricketers
Lesbian sportswomen